Balikoowa (officially known as Balikoowa in the City) is a Ugandan drama-comedy series that airs on Spark TV - Uganda. The series is directed by Kennedy Kihire, produced at Fast Track Productions and stars Marion Asiro, Housen Mushema, Monica Birwinyo and Undercover Brothers Ug's Jay K. Mulungi.

Plot
Balikoowa in the City follows a story of "Balikoowa" (Housen Mushema), a villager who heads to the city (Kampala) on an errand to his aunt's daughter "Sophia" (Marion Asiro). He has to deal with the city life for as long his errand lasts.

Title Theme
The title theme for the series is called Balikoowa and was composed and written by Undercover Brothers Ug's Jay K. Mulungi and Timothy Kirya.

See also
Beneath The Lies
Yat Madit
Coffee Shop (TV Series)
Deception NTV
The Campus (TV Series)
The Hostel (TV Series)

References

Ugandan drama television series
2016 Ugandan television series debuts
2010s Ugandan television series
2017 Ugandan television series endings
Ugandan comedy television series